Kayaaltı can refer to:

 Kayaaltı, Burdur
 Kayaaltı, Göle
 Kayaaltı, Oltu